The Leopoldstädter Tempel was the largest synagogue of Vienna, in the district (Bezirk) of Leopoldstadt. It was also known as the Israelitische Bethaus in der Wiener Vorstadt Leopoldstadt. It was built in 1858 in a Moorish Revival style by the architect Ludwig Förster. The tripartite facade of the Leopoldstädter, with its tall central section flanked by lower wings on each side, became the model for numerous Moorish Revival synagogues, including the Choral Temple in Bucharest, which has an almost identical main facade, the Zagreb Synagogue, the Spanish Synagogue in Prague, the Tempel Synagogue in Kraków and the Grand Synagogue of Edirne.

This temple was destroyed during the Kristallnacht on November 10, 1938. A memorial plaque on the site reads in German (and Hebrew):

translated as:

Synagogues influenced by the Leopoldstädter Tempel

The Tempel, which housed a prestigious congregation in the capital of the Empire, inspired the construction of several other synagogues in the Moorish Revival style. Some are designed similarly to Forster's building, with a flat facade and roof, tripartite massing with a large central block, symmetrical decorative minarets, and internal basilica plan with balconies.

Grand Synagogue of Edirne, Turkey
Zagreb Synagogue, Croatia
Vercelli Synagogue
Plum Street Temple, Cincinnati, Ohio, USA
Spanish Synagogue, Prague, Czech Republic
Tempel Synagogue, Kraków, Poland
Sofia Synagogue, Sofia, Bulgaria
Choral Temple, Bucharest, Romania
Great Choral Synagogue, Kyiv, Ukraine
Brodsky Choral Synagogue, Kyiv, Ukraine
Dohány Street Synagogue, Budapest, Hungary

Famous members
Josef Goldstein, cantor at the synagogue
Adolf Jellinek, rabbi at the synagogue
Moritz Güdemann, rabbi at the synagogue
Israel Taglicht, rabbi at the synagogue

Memorials

See also
History of the Jews in Austria
Stadttempel

References

Martens, Bob; Herbert Peter (2011). "The Destroyed Synagogues of Vienna - Virtual city walks". Vienna: LIT Verlag.

External links

Moorish Revival synagogues
Synagogues completed in 1858
Leopoldstadter
Leopoldstädter Tempel
Leopoldstädter Tempel
Tempel
Buildings and structures demolished in the 20th century